Second Generation is a 1964 novel by Raymond Williams, set in the 1960s.  The contrasting worlds of the university and the factory, and individuals who try to find their place among contradictory forces.

Plot summary
Harold Owen, his brother Gwyn, son Peter and wife Kate all experience the contrasts.  The book is based on the actual situation in Oxford of the 1960s, where the ancient university was right next to Morris Motors, as it then was.

See also

 Border Country
 The Fight for Manod

1964 British novels
Anglo-Welsh novels
Novels by Raymond Williams
Novels set in Oxford
Chatto & Windus books